The women's 4×100 metre freestyle relay event at the 2015 African Games took place on 8 September 2015 at Kintele Aquatic Complex.

Schedule
All times are Congo Standard Time (UTC+01:00)

Records

Results

Final

References

External links
Official website

Swimming at the 2015 African Games
2015 in women's swimming